Frank Michael Beisler (October 18, 1911 — September 8, 1973) was an American ice hockey defenseman. He played two games in the National Hockey League for the New York Americans between 1937 and 1940. The rest of his career, which lasted from 1931 to 1946, was spent in the minor leagues. After his playing career he spent several years as a coach in the American Hockey League. He was born in New Haven, Connecticut.

Career statistics

Regular season and playoffs

External links
 

1911 births
1973 deaths
American ice hockey coaches
American men's ice hockey defensemen
Buffalo Bisons (AHL) players
Eastern Hockey League coaches
Hershey Bears players
Ice hockey people from New Haven, Connecticut
New Haven Eagles players
New York Americans players
Springfield Indians players